Syeda Huma Batool (born 20 October 1982) is a Pakistani businesswoman. She is the owner and chairperson of Alvir Airways, and the managing director of Vantage Laboratories. She is the first woman to own a Pakistan-based scheduled airline.

Early life and education 

Batool was born in Faisalabad, Pakistan, to Syeda Shakira, an educator, and Syed Ahzar Hassan, a landlord and businessman. She is the youngest in her family with five older siblings.
Her grandfather Syed Muzaffar Ali Shah served in the Indian Civil Service and was a renowned Sufi. One of her grandfather’s brothers Syed Mazhar Ali Shah served as a fighter pilot in the British Royal Airforce before the partition of the subcontinent and another was the Commissioner of Dhaka. Her grandparents migrated from Ludhiana and Jalandhar and her forefathers were settled in Shahpur, India. She inherited land holdings and business capital from her paternal sources.

Batool was educated at Divisional Public School, Faisalabad. Later she graduated from Kinnaird College for Women, Lahore and completed a master's degree in English from Government College University, Lahore. Several  years later she also completed her MPhil degree in English Literature at Fatima Jinnah Women University, Rawalpindi.

Business career 

After several years working in an import business, Batool decided to build her own medicine manufacturing facility under the name of Vantage Laboratories Private Limited. She based the factory in a remote area with the intent of generating employment and development in the Faisalabad area.

References 

People from Faisalabad
Government College University, Lahore alumni
Kinnaird College for Women University alumni
1982 births
Living people